Comitas raybaudii is a species of sea snail, a marine gastropod mollusk in the family Pseudomelatomidae, the turrids and allies.

Description
The length of the shell attains 46 mm.

Distribution
This species occurs in the Indian Ocean off Somalia.

References

 Bozzetti, L. (1994c) Description of a new species of the genus Comitas from North Eastern Somalia. Bulletin of the Institute of Malacology Tokyo, 3, 33–35, pl. 10.

External linkls
 
 

Endemic fauna of Somalia
raybaudii
Gastropods described in 1994